Judas the Apostle my refer to:

 Judas Iscariot, the apostle who betrayed Jesus
 Jude the Apostle, also known as Thaddaeus and Judas "not Iscariot"
 Thomas the Apostle, known in some sources as Judas Thomas

See also
 Judas (disambiguation)